Chocolate is a 2019 South Korean television series starring Yoon Kye-sang, Ha Ji-won, Jang Seung-jo, Teo Yoo and Min Jin-woong. Produced by JYP Pictures, it aired on JTBC from November 29, 2019 to January 18, 2020.

Synopsis
The story of a man who became a neurosurgeon though he dreamt of becoming a cook, and a woman who became a cook because of him.

Cast

Main

Supporting

Kang's family
 Kang Boo-ja as Han Yong-seol - Kang's & Joon's grandmother.  CEO of Geosung Hospital.
 Lee Jae-ryong as Lee Seung-hoon - Joon's father
 Kim Sun-kyung as Yoon Hye-mi - Joon's mother
 Lee Eon-jung as Jeong Soo-hee - Kang's mother
 Yoon Ye-hee as Lee Seo-hoon - Joon's paternal aunt

People at the hospice
 Kim Won-hae as Kwon Hyeon-seok - Administrator of Geosung Hospice, Kwon Min-Seong's father.
 Kim Ho-jung as Han Seon-ae - Kwon's ex-wife. Chef who volunteers in the hospice kitchen.
 Shin Ha-young as Kim Hee-ju - Hospice patient.  A potter who taught Joon pottery.
 Yeom Hye-ran as Ha Yeong-sil - Hospice nurse.
 Lee Ju-yoen as Bae Na-ra - Hospice nurse whose father forcefully removes her from the hospice.

Others
 Yoo In-soo as Jo Seung-goo
 Lee Yong-yi as Jang Sook-ja
 Jang Duk-joo as Ha Dong-goo - fisherman who loved Kang's mother and treated Kang as a son
 Lee Hyo-bin as Kim In-joo - Kwon Min-seong's fiance

Special appearances
 Kim Yu-bin as Oh Jeong-Bok (Ep. 11, Ep. 12 & Ep. 13) - Kang's childhood friend and Ha Dong-goo's niece
 Lina as woman in the museum (Ep. 16) - Lina and Jang Seung-jo (Joon) are married in real life
 Yoon Bo-ra as Hui Na (Ep. 13, Ep 15 & Ep 16) - hospice patient and youtuber.

Production
Chocolate marks screenwriter Lee Kyung-hee and director Lee Hyung-min's first collaboration in 15 years, after having worked together on the critically acclaimed television series I'm Sorry, I Love You (2004).

Original soundtrack

Part 1

Part 2

Part 3

Part 4

Part 5

Part 6

Part 7

Part 8

Part 9

Part 10

Part 11

Chart performance

Viewership

Notes

References

External links
  
 
  

JTBC television dramas
2010s South Korean television series
2019 South Korean television series debuts
2020 South Korean television series endings
Television shows written by Lee Kyung-hee
Television series by JYP Entertainment
Korean-language Netflix exclusive international distribution programming